Bonney Riegel is a riegel, or rock bar extending north from the Kukri Hills across Taylor Valley to Lake Bonney, in Victoria Land. It was named in association with Lake Bonney by the Western Journey Party, led by Griffith Taylor, of the British Antarctic Expedition, 1910–13.

References
 

Ridges of Victoria Land
McMurdo Dry Valleys